Strickler Site is a historic archaeological site located at Manor Township, Lancaster County, Pennsylvania. It is the site of a large, stockaded Susquehannock village dated to the 17th century.  Excavations revealed nearly 13 longhouse patterns and cemeteries including hundreds of interments.

It was listed on the National Register of Historic Places in 1973.

References

Archaeological sites on the National Register of Historic Places in Pennsylvania
Archaeological sites in Lancaster County, Pennsylvania
Susquehannock
National Register of Historic Places in Lancaster County, Pennsylvania